The 1988 National Soccer League season, was the 12th season of the National Soccer League in Australia.

League table

Finals series

Individual awards
Player(s) of the Year: Paul Wade (South Melbourne); Frank Farina (Marconi Fairfield)
U-21 Player of the Year: Paul Trimboli (South Melbourne)
Top Scorer: Frank Farina (Marconi Fairfield) – 16 goals
Coach of the Year: Brian Garvey (South Melbourne)

References
- NSL Awards
Australia 1988 (RSSSF)

National Soccer League (Australia) seasons
1
Aus